Alvaton is an unincorporated community in Meriwether County, in the U.S. state of Georgia.

History
Alvaton had its start when the Atlanta, Birmingham and Atlantic Railroad was extended to that point. A post office was established at Alvaton in 1908. The community was named after one Alva McCrary. The Georgia General Assembly incorporated Alvaton as a town in 1911. The town was officially dissolved in 1995.

References

Former municipalities in Georgia (U.S. state)
Populated places disestablished in 1995
Unincorporated communities in Meriwether County, Georgia
Unincorporated communities in Georgia (U.S. state)